Kais Nashef (born ) is a Palestinian (Arab-Israeli) actor of both Palestinian and German descent.

Born in Tayibe, Israel, to an Arab-Muslim father, and to a German-Christian mother.

Nashef studied acting at the Beit Zvi Institute of Performing Arts in Ramat Gan. He later played the lead role in Paradise Now, a film about two would-be suicide bombers in the West Bank. In 2018, he won the best actor award at the Venice Film Festival for his role in Tel Aviv on Fire.

Filmography

References

External links
 

1978 births
Living people
People from Tayibe
Beit Zvi School for the Performing Arts alumni
Palestinian male film actors
German expatriates in Israel
Arab citizens of Israel
Israeli Muslims
Israeli people of German descent